is a former Japanese footballer. He played for various clubs in Indonesia and Singapore throughout his career.

References

Japanese footballers
Japanese expatriate footballers
Living people
Expatriate footballers in Singapore
Expatriate footballers in Indonesia
Liga 1 (Indonesia) players
Japan Soccer College players
Bontang F.C. players
Persiba Balikpapan players
Persib Bandung players
Persita Tangerang players
Japanese expatriate sportspeople in Singapore
Japanese expatriate sportspeople in Indonesia
1984 births
Albirex Niigata Singapore FC players
Singapore Premier League players
Association football forwards